The Battle of Ansaba took place in autumn of 1963, and was part of the Eritrean War of Independence. It was fought in Jengeren, North of Keren, In Anseba Region.   

In the battle, the Eritrean Liberation Front successfully ambushed an enemy convoy heading from Keren to Halhal. In the battle, the ELF captured 23 guns, including a Bren light machine gun, as well as ammunitions. The ambush was led by Mohammed Idris Haj, who died of wounds he had received in the confrontation.

References

Eritrean War of Independence
Battles involving Ethiopia
Battles involving Eritrea